Nashta District is a district (bakhsh) in Tonekabon County, Mazandaran Province, Iran. At the 2006 census, its population was 24,583, in 6,867 families.  The District has one city: Nashtarud. The District has two rural districts (dehestan): Katra Rural District and Tameshkol Rural District.

References 

Tonekabon County
Districts of Mazandaran Province